María Torres García (born 22 July 1997) is a Spanish karateka. She won the gold medal in the women's +68 kg event at the 2021 World Karate Championships held in Dubai, United Arab Emirates. She won the silver medal in the women's +68 kg event at the 2022 World Games held in Birmingham, United States.

She won one of the bronze medals in the women's team kumite event at the 2018 World Karate Championships held in Madrid, Spain. In June 2021, she competed at the World Olympic Qualification Tournament held in Paris, France hoping to qualify for the 2020 Summer Olympics in Tokyo, Japan.

She won one of the bronze medals in the women's team kumite event at the 2022 European Karate Championships held in Gaziantep, Turkey. She also competed in the women's +68 kg event where she was eliminated in her third match. She lost her bronze medal match in the women's +68 kg event at the 2022 Mediterranean Games held in Oran, Algeria. Two weeks, later, she won the silver medal in the women's +68 kg event at the 2022 World Games held in Birmingham, United States.

Achievements

References 

Living people
1997 births
Sportspeople from Málaga
Spanish female karateka
Competitors at the 2022 Mediterranean Games
Mediterranean Games competitors for Spain
Competitors at the 2022 World Games
World Games silver medalists
World Games medalists in karate
21st-century Spanish women